Get Smart is an American comedy television series that ran from 1965 to 1970.

Get Smart may also refer to:

Get Smart franchise based on the 1965-1970 television series
(Chronological)
The Nude Bomb, aka The Return of Maxwell Smart (1980), out-of-continuity feature film based on the 1965–1970 series
Get Smart, Again! (1989), a made-for-TV movie follow-up to the 1965–1970 series 
Get Smart (1995 TV series), a 1995 revival of the television series
Get Smart (film), a 2008 feature film based on the series
Get Smart's Bruce and Lloyd: Out of Control, a 2008 feature film serving as a companion to the above film

Music
Get Smart! (band), a 1980s alternative rock band
"Get Smart", a song by Cinerama from Torino

Other

 Get Smart, a campaign by the Centers for Disease Control and Prevention to prevent unnecessary use of antibiotics which may cause antibiotic resistance.